The Tulare County Regional Transit Agency (TCRTA) is a joint powers agency formed by all the cities in Tulare County, California (except Visalia) alongside the county government on August 17, 2020. It operates the public transportation systems within and connecting the respective member agencies, including the legacy systems Dinuba Area Regional Transit (DART, in Dinuba), Porterville Transit (PT, Porterville), Tulare InterModal Express (TIME, in the City of Tulare), and Tulare County Area Transit (TCaT, intercity routes). It is the largest single public transit agency in Tulare County.

History 
The cities of Exeter, Farmersville, Lindsay, Porterville, Tulare, and Woodlake in partnership with the County of Tulare were the initial seven member agencies of TCRTA, which was formed by unanimously adopting the draft by-laws on August 17, 2020. In September 2020, Dinuba joined TCRTA as the eighth member. Collectively, these represent all the cities within Tulare County with the sole exception of Visalia, the largest city and county seat, which has chosen to retain its independent Visalia Transit agency. The consolidation is expected to result in uniform fares, more efficient routes, and easier intercity travel within Tulare County.

Memoranda of understanding (MoU) were signed between TCRTA and the cities of Dinuba, Tulare, and Woodlake at the May 17, 2021 TCRTA Board of Directors meeting, transferring ownership, operation, and administration of public transportation systems in those cities to TCRTA. A similar MoU for Porterville signed at the same May meeting effectively allowed that city to provide transit operations and maintenance services for Woodlake. The first legacy system to transition to TCRTA administration was the bus service in Woodlake, starting on July 1, 2021. Porterville Transit loaned several minivans to Woodlake, replacing the minibuses that previously were operated by that city.

Services

Fixed routes 
TCRTA has assumed operation of legacy fixed routes from Dinuba (DART), Porterville (Porterville Transit), the City of Tulare (TIME), and Tulare County (TCaT). Prefixes designate the legacy system from which the route was inherited.

Legacy systems

Dinuba 
Under Dinuba Area Regional Transit (DART), Dinuba operated four routes, including one longer-distance route ("Dinuba Connection") connecting Dinuba to Reedley in Fresno County, two flexible routes ("North" and "South") allowing deviations to serve dial-a-ride passengers between nominal fixed route stops, and a fare-free single fixed route ("Jolly Trolley") serving popular businesses.

Exeter 
The City of Exeter began operating a dial-a-ride intracity on-demand transit service in 1991. Service to its larger neighbor Visalia is provided by Visalia Transit. On July 1, 2017, Visalia Transit took over intracity dial-a-ride services within Exeter. The steep fare increase, from $1 under Exeter to $2.25 under Visalia, resulted in citizens berating the City Council.

Farmersville 
The City of Farmersville also relied on Visalia Transit for public transportation connections to Visalia, with Farmersville compensating Visalia annually from its transportation funding allocation.

Lindsay 
Dial-a-ride services within Lindsay were provided under annual agreements with Tulare County. TCaT also provided service for circulation within Lindsay (Route 60) and connections to Porterville and the neighboring unincorporated communities of Plainview, Poplar-Cotton Center, Strathmore, and Woodville (Route 90).

Porterville 

Porterville Transit operates six fixed routes within Porterville; there were nine fixed routes prior to the COVID-19 pandemic, with one of the fixed routes providing service to the Tule River Indian Reservation.

Tulare 
The City of Tulare operated the Tulare InterModal Express (TIME) transit service, which provided six fixed routes within Tulare and one express route, jointly operated with Visalia Transit, that connected those two cities. The six fixed routes within Tulare were named for their geographical coverage (#1 Northwest; #2 Southeast; #3 West; #4 Northeast; #5 Southwest; and #7 East); all routes, including Tulare–Visalia service (#11X) met at the central Tulare Transit Center (360 N. K St). Sunday service was added in 2015.

Tulare County 

Tulare County Area Transit (TCaT) provided mainly intercity routes, linking cities and communities within Tulare County.

Woodlake 
Woodlake operated a dial-a-ride service within the city limits and unincorporated areas of the county starting in 1999; fixed intercity routes serving Woodlake were previously operated by Orange Belt Stages and TCaT.

The Woodlake dial-a-ride service typically operated one of the city's three 16-passenger cutaway minibuses with the other two left in reserve. The Woodlake city bus connected with TCaT Route 30 at the Whitney Transit Center, which opened in October 2013 at 201 E Lakeview in downtown Woodlake; in total, there were four bus shelters: one at Whitney and the others at local schools (Woodlake High School, F.J. White Learning Center, and Castle Rock Elementary).

Structure 
Each member agency appoints one elected official and one alternate representative to serve on the TCRTA Board of Directors. TCRTA holds one meeting per month, scheduled for the third Monday at 3 PM.

Fleet and facilities

Facilities 
The Tulare County Transit Operations and Maintenance Facility (TOMF) held a grand opening on September 23, 2021. The TOMF can accommodate up to 25 buses with a  building that includes administration, operations, dispatch, and maintenance facilities. It is located near the county's Visalia Road Yard, at the intersection of Avenues 256 (Sierra) and 140 (South Lover's Lane).

References

External links 
 

Public transportation in the San Joaquin Valley Area
Bus transportation in California
Public transportation in Tulare County, California
Transit agencies in California